is a museum on the island of Ōzushima in the Inland Sea, in Shūnan, Yamaguchi Prefecture, Japan, dedicated to the history and memory of the Kaiten, a Special Attack Unit of the Imperial Japanese Navy. The museum first opened near the remains of the island's training base in 1968, reopening in today's building in 1998. The collection of some one thousand items includes wills, letters, uniforms, personal belongings, and photographs. The displays combine these exhibits with information panels on the background and history of the unit and the lives of those served in it. The museum is "a facility for learning about Peace through the minds and hearts of the Kaiten".

See also

 Setonaikai National Park
 Chiran Peace Museum for Kamikaze Pilots
 Bansei Tokkō Peace Museum
 Japanese Special Attack Units
 Ōkunoshima

Notes

References

External links
  Kaiten Memorial Museum
  Kaiten Memorial Museum  (article on the "Kamikaze Images" website)

Shūnan, Yamaguchi
Museums in Yamaguchi Prefecture
Japan in World War II
World War II memorials in Japan
World War II museums in Japan
Peace museums
World War II suicide weapons of Japan
Museums established in 1968
1968 establishments in Japan
Imperial Japanese Navy
Seto Inland Sea